Penny Newman (born May 30, 1947) is an environmentalist, a community organizer, and the former director of the Center for Community Action and Environmental Justice (CCAEJ) in Riverside County, California. She is best known for her advocacy work on the Stringfellow Acid Pits, a toxic waste disposal site located in the community of Glen Avon (now incorporated into the City of Jurupa Valley, California), that led to new state and federal rules regarding how toxic waste is disposed.

References

Jurupa Valley, California
People from Riverside County, California
People from San Bernardino County, California
American environmentalists
American women environmentalists
1947 births
Living people
21st-century American women